The Jersey City mayoral election of 2001 was held on May 8, 2001. The mayor is popularly elected in a nonpartisan general election. The incumbent Mayor of Jersey City, Bret Schundler, did not run for re-election. 

A runoff held on June 5, 2001. Glenn Cunningham was elected, becoming the first African-American mayor of Jersey City. His opponent in the run-off was Thomas A. DeGise, who later became Hudson County Executive. It was one of the most expensive local races in New Jersey history.

Cunningham died in office before completing his term.

Election results 

Gerald McCann, who had served two non-consecutive terms as Mayor of Jersey City before being convicted of fraud in a savings-and-loan scam, attempted to file a petition to run but was barred from doing so.

Runoff

References 

2001 New Jersey elections
2001
Jersey City
May 2001 events in the United States
June 2001 events in the United States